Lamar Dupré Calhoun (November 18, 1971 – January 9, 2017), better known as DJ Crazy Toones, was an American hip hop producer and deejay. He was a member of the rap group WC and the Maad Circle and was later signed to Ice Cube's Lench Mob Records.

Calhoun was born in Houston, Texas but grew up in Los Angeles, CA and was the brother of WC.

Calhoun died from a heart attack on January 9, 2017, at the age of 45.

Discography

Collaboration albums
Ain't a Damn Thang Changed with WC and the Maad Circle (1991)
Curb Servin' with WC and the Maad Circle (1995)

Mixtapes
That Nigga's Crazy: Maad Circle Underground (Part 1) (1996)
CT Experience (2006)
On the Back Streets with Kokane (2010)

References

External links 

1971 births
2017 deaths
American hip hop DJs
Artists from Houston
Place of death missing
American hip hop record producers
WC and the Maad Circle members
Record producers from Texas